"Thanks" is a song recorded by American country singer-songwriter Bill Anderson. It was written by Bill Martin and Phil Coulter and previously recorded by J. Vincent Edwards in 1969.  Bill Anderson's version was released as a single in 1975 via MCA Records and became a major hit the same year.

Background and release
"Thanks" was recorded on April 10, 1975 at Bradley's Barn, a studio located in Mount Juliet, Tennessee. The sessions were produced by Owen Bradley, who would serve as Anderson's producer through most of years with MCA Records. The single's B-side was also cut at the same studio session: "Why'd the Last Time Have to Be the Best.".

"Thanks" was released as a single by MCA Records in August 1975. The song spent 11 weeks on the Billboard Hot Country Singles before reaching number 24 in October 1975. In Canada, the single reached number 19 on the RPM Country Songs chart in 1975.. It was released on his 1976 studio album, Peanuts and Diamonds and Other Jewels.

Track listings
7" vinyl single
 "Thanks" – 2:26
 "Why'd the Last Time Have to Be the Best" – 2:46

Chart performance

References

1975 singles
1975 songs
Bill Anderson (singer) songs
MCA Records singles
Song recordings produced by Owen Bradley
Songs written by Bill Anderson (singer)